HNLMS Witte de With may refer to following ships of the Royal Netherlands Navy:

 , an 
 , a 
 , a  originally to be named Witte de With

Citations

References
 

Royal Netherlands Navy ship names